Hugh Lambert Stewart  (2 May 1907 — 12 December 1995) was a Scottish first-class cricketer and administrator.

Stewart was born in May 1907 at Ceres, Fife. He was educated at the Dollar Academy. A club cricketer for Cupar Cricket Club, Stewart made two appearances in first-class cricket for Scotland in 1932, against Ireland at Grennock and the touring South Americans at Edinburgh. He scored 45 runs in his two matches, with a highest score of 25, while with his right-arm fast-medium bowling, he took a single wicket. Stewart later served as the president of the Scottish Cricket Union in 1962.

Outside of cricket, Stewart was also a noted rugby player. He was a justice of the peace for Fife, being appointed in December 1934. Stewart died in December 1995 at Cupar, Fife.

References

External links
 

1907 births
1995 deaths
Sportspeople from Fife
People educated at Dollar Academy
Scottish cricketers
Scottish justices of the peace
Scottish cricket administrators